The Viking Ship Museum in Roskilde is Denmark's national ship museum for ships of the prehistoric and medieval period.

The main focus of the museum is a permanent exhibition of the Skuldelev ships, five original Viking ships excavated nearby in 1962. The Viking Ship Museum also conducts research and educates researchers in the fields of maritime history, marine archaeology and experimental archaeology. Various academic conferences are held here and there is a research library in association with the museum.

Original Viking ships 

Around the year 1070, five Viking ships were deliberately sunk at Skuldelev in Roskilde Fjord in order to block the most important fairway and to protect Roskilde from an enemy attack from the sea. These ships, later known as the Skuldelev ships, were excavated in 1962. They turned out to be five different types of ships ranging from cargo ships to ships of war.

The Viking Ship Museum overlooking the inlet of Roskilde Fjord was built in 1969 with the main purpose of exhibiting the five newly discovered Skuldelev ships. 

The original Skuldelev Viking ships are the main focus of the museum, but a small exhibition about the Roskilde ships and various temporary exhibitions with a broader scope can also be experienced here.

Roskilde ships 
In the late 1990s, excavations for the shipyard expansion of the Viking Ship Museum uncovered the remains of a further nine ships, the Roskilde ships, from the medieval period. It is the largest discovery of prehistoric ships in Northern Europe. All except Roskilde 8 have been excavated and their remains are at the National Museum of Denmark (Roskilde 6 on display, remaining in storage).

Reconstructed Viking ships and historical boats 

The Viking Ship Museum has a long tradition of Viking ship reconstructions and boat building and also collects boats of interest from all over Scandinavia. The boat collection at the museum now comprise more than 40 vessels and the associated ship building yard is constantly building new ships by original methods as part an experimental archaeology learning process. It is possible to follow or engage in the ship building process here. The shipyard is located on a small isle known as Museumsøen (Museum Island), connected to the main museum exhibition buildings by a drawbridge.

Every summer, a handful of boats are launched for extended sea voyages to accumulate more knowledge about the seafaring techniques and conditions of the Vikings.

Gallery

See also
 Ladby ship
 National Museum of Denmark
 Viking Ship Museum in Oslo

References

External links

 
 Picture Gallery
 Pictures of the Viking ship replicas, from visit in August 2009 Many high resolution photos
 "Rebirth of the Viking warship that may have helped Canute conquer the seas", Maev Kennedy, The Guardian, 27 December 2012

Museums established in 1969
Maritime museums in Denmark
Roskilde
Listed buildings and structures in Roskilde Municipality
Archaeology of shipwrecks
Ships preserved in museums
Viking Age museums
1969 establishments in Denmark
Museums in Region Zealand